Gaffigan is a surname. Notable people with the surname include:

James Gaffigan (conductor) (born 1979), American conductor
Jeannie Gaffigan (born 1970), American actress, producer and comedy writer
Jim Gaffigan (born 1966), American stand-up comedian, actor, writer, and producer

See also
McGaffigan